Kenneth J Jones (20 February 1930 – 13 February 2014) was an English actor.

Jones was born in Liverpool. After working as a signwriter and performing as an amateur, he trained at RADA. Known for his roles as 'Horrible' Ives in Porridge and as Rex in The Squirrels, he also appeared in The Liver Birds as Uncle Dermot, in Goodnight Sweetheart as Owen Jones, and in Seconds Out as Dave Locket.

Personal life
Jones was married to the actress Sheila Fay, also a native of Liverpool, from 30 October 1964 until her death on 31 August 2013. He died from bowel cancer on 13 February 2014, seven days before his 84th birthday, in a nursing home in Prescot.

Filmography

Film

Television

References

External links

1930 births
2014 deaths
Alumni of RADA
Deaths from cancer in England
Deaths from colorectal cancer
English male television actors
Male actors from Liverpool
20th-century English male actors
21st-century English male actors